Organización Ardila Lülle is one of the most important conglomerates in Colombia. After positioning his company in the beverage sector, Carlos Ardila Lülle founded and consolidated the Organización Ardila Lülle, today comprising over 80 companies with more than 40,000 employees in Colombia, producing goods and services in sectors as diverse as communications, beverages, textiles, and entertainment.

Subsidiaries
 Beverages
 Postobon

 Media
 RCN TV
 RCN Radio
 RCN Entertainment
 RCN Nuestra Tele Internacional
 Nuestra Tele Noticias 24 Horas 
 Win Sports

 Agroindustrials
 Incauca
 Ingenio Providencia
 Bananal S.A.
 Industrias Forestales Doña María S.A.
 Sucromiles S.A.
 Sociedad Comercializadora Int. de Azúcares y Mieles S.A.

 Textiles

 Textiles Rionegro y Cia Ltda
 Coltejer S.A

 Financial Sector
 Coltefinanciera SA

 Automotive Sector
 Los Coches S.A., General Motors dealers in Colombia

 Sports teams
 Atlético Nacional

References

Conglomerate companies of Colombia